Lizzie Foster (10 September 1856 – 9 February 1948) was a British archer. She competed at the 1908 Summer Olympics in London. Foster competed at the 1908 Games in the only archery event open to women, the double National round. She took 7th place in the event with 553 points.

Foster competed with the Vale of White Horse Archers.

References

Sources

External links
 

1856 births
1948 deaths
Archers at the 1908 Summer Olympics
Olympic archers of Great Britain
British female archers